"Walking Disaster" is the second track on Sum 41's 2007 studio album Underclass Hero. It was released as the second single from the album, impacting radio on July 24, 2007.  The band performed the song on The Tonight Show with Jay Leno on July 24, 2007.

Overview
Written by Deryck Whibley, "Walking Disaster" is a classic, upbeat pop-punk song, drawing similarities from fellow Underclass Hero song "March of the Dogs". According to Whibley, the song illustrates his tattered childhood and his reflections as an adult. The song, being somewhat chronological, opens with "Mom and Dad both in denial, an only child to take the blame", a vision of Whibley's past, damaged by his conflicting parents. "Walking Disaster" ends on an optimistic note, "I can't wait to see you smile, wouldn't miss it for the world", expressing his maturation as an adult, in the light of being able to see things differently and ultimately, understanding his childhood.

"Walking Disaster" is a song that captures the concept of "confusion and frustration of modern society", the underlying theme in Underclass Hero.

Music video
Sum 41 recorded the music video for "Walking Disaster"  while in Los Angeles during the time of their stay when they performed on Jay Leno. The video premiered on August 20 on MTV2. The video focuses on a toy robot walking around L.A. Meanwhile, the band is playing in a toy store in Los Angeles. In the end the robot finds his way back home to the toy store which has been trashed by Sum 41.

Track listing

Charts

References

External links

2007 singles
Sum 41 songs
Island Records singles
Songs written by Deryck Whibley
2007 songs